Lokoya may refer to:
Lokoya, California
Lokoya people
Lokoya language